Assi Cohen (born October 10, 1974) is an Israeli comedian and actor. He is best known for his appearances in the feature film Colombian Love (alongside Mili Avital), as well as for television performances in Love Hurts (alongside Dana Modan), "Rak BeYsrael" with his comedy duo of "Assi and Guri", his role in Mesudarim (US title Loaded), and for his part in Eretz Nehederet, where he has impersonated Avigdor Lieberman, Raleb Majadele, and Uri Geller among others.

In a Ynet poll conducted in May 2008, Assi Cohen was selected by respondents as the funniest Israeli for the second year in a row. He currently resides in Tel Aviv and is married with two daughters.

Biography
Cohen was born in Israel, to a Sephardic Jewish family from Turkey and Egypt, and raised and educated in the coastal city of Ashdod. During his military service he was an actor for the Israel Defense Forces' theatre, members of which are soldiers on active duty. Following his military service he worked as a stand up comic at the Domino Gross club in Tel Aviv, where he partnered with fellow comedian Guri Alfi to create the comedy duo of "Assi and Guri".

From 1999 onward he worked as a comedian and joined the TV show Domino, which aired on the commercial Channel 2 in Israel. The show, a follow-up to the highly successful Platfus, was a second television production from the Domino Gross. Participants (such as Adir Miller, Rotem Aboav, Roi Bar-Natan and Guri Alfi) were comedians who appeared regularly at the club. Assi Cohen and Guri Alfi continued to tour the country as "Assi and Guri". They created, among others, favourite characters such as David (Cohen) and Tikva (Alfi), a disgruntled married couple, and Coco (Cohen) and Steve (Alfi), a singer and keyboard player duo singing satirical songs inspired by Mizrahi music.

In 2001, alongside his duo performances, Assi played in the TV drama Star Shining above the Heart alongside Dana Ivgi, Irit Sheleg, and Ilana Berkowitz.

In 2002 he joined the show "Rak BeYsrael" (Channel 2) (lit. Only in Israel) alongside Guri Alfi as side-kicks to main characters "Limor" (Orna Banai) and "Shimon" (Erez Tal). That same year, he and Guri Alfi created a comedy show called "Shidurei Hamahapeha" (Channel 2) (literally The revolution's broadcasts) and participated in the controversial film Yossi & Jagger, which portrayed a homosexual relationship between a soldier (played by Yehuda Levi) and his commander (Ohad Knoller). He later participated in the comedy show "We Won't Stop Laughing" alongside Guri Alfi, Rotem Aboav, Eli Finish, and Mariano Idelman.

In 2003 he acted in the film Bonjour Monsieur Shlomi (Also: Ha-Kochavim Shel Shlomi). The same year he and Alfi broke up their comedy duo and Cohen married Lian Friedman.

In 2004 Cohen returned to television in the comedy show Eifo Ata Chai?! (lit. Where have you been living?!) alongside Erez Tal, Shlomo Baraba, and Hadar Levi. He played several characters such as Coco the Mizrahi singer, and Himri the healer. That year he also starred in the film Colombian Love (with Mili Avital, Menashe Noi and others) as a newly married husband whose father insists he divorce his bride. Also in 2004, Cohen played alongside Dana Modan in the Israeli Emmy Award-winning television drama, Love Hurts.

In 2005 he participated in the Steven Spielberg feature film Munich, dealing with the Israeli government's secret retaliation after the 1972 Munich massacre of Israeli Olympic athletes. The film featured  actors Eric Bana, Daniel Craig, and Geoffrey Rush as well as Israeli actors like Ayelet Zurer and Gila Almagor. That same year he started his participation in the Emmy Award and Golden Screen award-winning television show "Eretz Nehederet" (Hebrew: , lit. Wonderful Country), a satirical comedy with references to current affairs and parodies of the people involved. Among his characters on the show, Cohen impersonated Illusionist Uri Geller, Football player Avi Nimni, Right-wing politician Avigdor Lieberman, and Arab Knesset member and minister Raleb Majadele. Cohen also participated that year in a short film titled "Halev HaRaev" (lit. The Hungry Heart) and hosted a show about What Makes an Israeli for Keshet's 57th Israeli Independence special, an 8-clip show portraying Israeli behaviors such as "wiping" humus to eat it, feeling a bread before purchasing it, drinking of "Mud" coffee, and others.

In 2007 he participated in the entertainment television show "Mesudarim" (Channel 2) (meaning "settled [for life]" in Israeli slang), where four childhood friends sell their gaming startup company for USD$217 million, and have to deal with their newfound wealth. Chapter 9 of the show contained the first crossover in Israeli television, with the drama "BeTipul" (lit. "In Treatment"), which was later purchased by HBO; BeTipul's psychologist, played by Asi Dayan, is asked to analyze the group. The format of Mesudarim was purchased by Fox Entertainment Group and shown in the US as "Loaded".
In 2009 he participated in a critically acclaimed television show "Hatufim" (Prisoners of War). The show went to be the most successful in Israel and soon after the original script of Gideon Raff was sold to Hollywood for remake which is known as "Homeland".

In 2018 he had the lead role in the dystopian drama miniseries, Autonomies.

Filmography

References

External links
 

1974 births
Living people
Israeli people of Turkish-Jewish descent
Israeli people of Egyptian-Jewish descent
Israeli entertainers
Israeli male comedians
Israeli male film actors
Israeli Sephardi Jews
Israeli male stage actors
Israeli male television actors
People from Ashdod
Israeli Mizrahi Jews